MOPSO may refer to:

 Multiple Objective Particle Swarm Optimization
 2-Hydroxy-3-morpholinopropanesulfonic acid, a chemical buffering agent